José Abreu may refer to:
José Abreu (born 1987), Cuban baseball player
José Abreu (second baseman) (1910–?), Cuban baseball player
José Antonio Abreu (1939–2018), Venezuelan orchestra conductor and advocate of music education for youth
Antonio José Álvarez de Abreu, 1st Marquis of la Regalía (1688–1756), Spanish colonial administrator
José Abreu Morell (1864–1889), Cuban painter